Matthew Freeman may refer to:

 Matt Freeman (basketball) (born 1997), player
 Matthew Freeman (twirler) (born 1992), baton twirler
 Matt Freeman (born 1966), American musician
 Matt Freeman (Power of Five), the protagonist of Anthony Horowitz's The Power of Five novels